Astrothelium megochroleucum is a species of corticolous (bark-dwelling), crustose lichen in the family Trypetheliaceae. Found in El Salvador, it was formally described as a new species in 2016 by Dutch lichenologist André Aptroot.

The lichen has a smooth and somewhat shiny, ochraceous thallus with a cortex and a thin (about 0.1 mm wide) black prothallus line. The presence of the lichen induces the formation of galls in the host plant; as a consequence, the bark underneath the thallus splits open and forms a callus. Both the thallus and the  contain lichexanthone, a lichen product that causes these structures to fluoresce yellow when lit with a long-wavelength UV light. The combination of characteristics of the lichen that distinguish it from others in Astrothelium are its prominent, whitish,  ascomata, and the dimensions of its ascospores (60–70 by 16–18 μm). These spores have three septa, a character that separates it from the otherwise similar Astrothelium ochroleucoides.

References

megochroleucum
Lichen species
Lichens described in 2016
Lichens of Central America
Taxa named by André Aptroot